Sir John Pollard Willoughby, 4th Baronet (21 April 1799 – 15 September 1866) was a British Conservative politician and civil servant.

Early life and family
Born at Baldon House, Oxfordshire, Willoughby was the son of Christopher Willoughby, and was educated at Merchant Taylors' School from 1809 to 1812. After a short break at sea, he then enrolled at the Haileybury College from 1815 to 1818.

Willoughby then entered the Bombay Civil Service in 1818, and was appointed assistant resident at Baroda in 1820. He married Eliza Kennedy, daughter of Colonel Michael Kennedy—a member of the Bombay Presidency army—in 1822, and then became a political agent at Kathiawar from 1828 until 1835, when he became Chief Secretary to the Government of Bombay until 1846. After this, he was a member of the Bombay Legislative Council until 1851.

He then returned to England, where, after the death of Eliza in 1852, he remarried to Elizabeth Hawkes, daughter of Thomas Hawkes MP, of Himley House, Staffordshire, in 1854. In the same year, he became a member of the Court of Directors, and held that role until 1858.

He had at least three children, Maria Martha (died 1871), Maria Gertrude (died 1939) and Mary Sophia (died 1853).

Member of Parliament
Willoughby was elected Conservative MP for Leominster at the 1857 general election and held the seat until 1858 when he resigned after he was appointed member of the Council of India.

Baronetcy
He became the 4th Baronet of Baldon House on 23 March 1865, upon the death of his brother, Henry Willoughby, but died the next year. The title was passed to John Christopher Willoughby.

References

External links
 

UK MPs 1857–1859
1799 births
1866 deaths
Conservative Party (UK) MPs for English constituencies
Baronets in the Baronetage of Great Britain